KPHE-LD (channel 44), branded on-air as Arizona's Family Sports and Entertainment Network (AzFSEN), is a low-power independent television station in Phoenix, Arizona, United States. It is owned by Gray Television alongside CBS affiliate KPHO-TV (channel 5) and independent station KTVK (channel 3), a grouping known as "Arizona's Family". KPHE-LD's transmitter is located atop South Mountain.

On the air by the mid-1990s and originally on channel 19, the station broadcast programming from several sources and was also used in a trial of wireless internet broadcasting from low-power TV stations in the early 2000s. From 2003 to 2006, the station broadcast Bohemia Visual Music, a music video service. During that time, Lotus Communications purchased the station, and it relocated to channel 44. Lotus then relaunched the station with Spanish-language programming, some of it local. In 2022, Gray Television acquired KPHE-LD. On March 1, 2023, the Arizona's Family Sports and Entertainment Network launched on channel 44, airing simulcasts of most of KTVK–KPHO's newscasts; Phoenix Rising FC soccer and Arizona high school state championships; and other programming.

History
On March 17, 1992, the Federal Communications Commission (FCC) granted an original construction permit to build low-power television station K19DD on UHF channel 19 to serve Phoenix and the East Valley. The station was owned by Scottsdale publisher Harlan L. Jacobsen, with transmitter location on Usery Mountain in east Mesa. K19DD was granted an initial license on July 13, 1995, and aired Bloomberg Television by 1996.

In June 1998, Jacobsen was granted a construction permit to operate an experimental broadcast station using the facilities of K19DD to broadcast in digital format. He Jacobsen sold the station to US Interactive LLC in September 1999; the new owners adopted the call sign KPHE-LP. In December 2000, the station became part of a pilot program to study the feasibility of using low-power UHF television stations to deliver wireless data services to subscribers. The Digital Data Services Act pilot project was effective from December 2000 through June 2002, during which time KPHE was unavailable as an over-the-air analog broadcast station.

After the pilot project was complete, KPHE programming consisted of a camera focused on a fish tank. Viewers could watch the fish while music played in the background. That changed in October 2003, when Valley residents Jeff Crawford and Jennifer Harris Crawford leased the station from US Interactive and took over its operations. The Crawfords had been operating a music video service called Bohemia AfterDark since 1982 and launched Bohemia Visual Music (BVM), a 24/7 music video channel.

In January 2004, Lotus Communications purchased KPHE from US Interactive. The sale was finalized in March, and the station continued to be operated by the Crawfords as Bohemia Visual Music. Lotus had intended to launch family-friendly Spanish-language programming, but the station continued to air Bohemia Visual Music. In March 2005, KPHE moved from channel 19 to channel 44, moved broadcast facilities from Usery Mountain to the South Mountain antenna farm, and upgraded its broadcast signal in preparation for future digital broadcasting.

In July 2006, more than a year after announcing its intention to launch a family-focused station, Lotus replaced Bohemia Visual Music programming, first with a mix of music videos, including recorded worship services, and later, with talk shows and other Bible-based instruction. The new programming was branded TV Inspiración. KPHE affiliated with Monterrey-based Multimedios Televisión in November 2006 while keeping TV Inspiración as secondary programming. In February 2007, KPHE announced that it would carry Spanish-language telecasts of Arizona Diamondbacks Major League Baseball home games, beginning with the 2007 season. These were separately produced broadcasts with their own play-by-play, color commentary, and on-field announcers. 50 games a season were aired in 2007 and in 2008; original plans called for 75 games in 2009, but the team dropped the deal because KPHE was unable to secure a slot on the local Cox Communications system.

In the 2010s and early 2020s, KPHE offered a constantly changing lineup of programming, primarily in Spanish and/or religious. KPHE had converted to digital broadcasting by June 2009 and was offering four subchannels: its local channel with programming from Telemax, the state TV network of Sonora, Mexico, and Multimedios; two channels of Seventh-day Adventist programming; and infomercials. Other subchannels that KPHE offered at one time or another included My Family TV and Retro TV, both owned by Luken Communications. In April 2013, the station became an affiliate of CNN Latino for eight hours a day, also continuing to air output from Telemax and local productions. Eventually, it shifted to airing mostly programming from LATV, though it was announced to air English-language coverage of Arizona Rattlers indoor football for 2021.

On March 11, 2022, Gray Television (owner of CBS affiliate KPHO-TV and independent station KTVK) filed an application to acquire KPHE-LD for $1.75 million. The sale was completed on May 4. Lotus had previously reached a deal to sell to Sovryn Holdings for $2 million, which was not consummated, as part of its exit from the few low-power TV stations it still owned. The primary subchannel continued to broadcast LATV. Gray then announced in January 2023 that it would launch the Arizona's Family Sports and Entertainment Network on March 1, 2023, and that it had acquired the rights to Phoenix Rising FC soccer for three years; KPHE will air all 34 matches per season, with five simulcasts on KTVK and one on KPHO in 2023.

Technical information

Subchannels
The station's digital signal is multiplexed:

References

External links
 Official website

Low-power television stations in the United States
PHE-LD
Television channels and stations established in 1995
Gray Television